This is the complete list of Commonwealth Games medalists in cycling from 1934 to 2014.

Men's track

Time trial

Sprint

+ Lionel Cox did not receive a silver medal, the Australian cycling team refused to participate in the gold and bronze medal playoffs and were subsequently disqualified.

Team sprint

Individual pursuit

Team pursuit

Scratch

Tandem

Points race

Keirin

Men's road

Road race

Team time trial

Individual time trial

Men's mountain biking

Cross country

Men's para-track

Tandem sprint B

Tandem 1 km time trial B

Women's track

Sprint

Individual pursuit

Points race

Time trial

Team sprint

Scratch

Women's road

Road race

Team time trial

Individual time trial

Women's mountain biking

Cross country

Women's para-track

Tandem sprint B

Tandem 1 km time trial B

References

Results Database from the Commonwealth Games Federation

Cycling
Medalists

Commonwealth